Jay Hoffman (born 20 January 1958) is an Australian former professional rugby league footballer who played in the 1970s and 1980s. He played for the 
He is the father of the rugby league footballer; Ryan Hoffman.

Prior to his move to Canberra, Hoffman played for Brisbane's Past Brothers in the Brisbane Rugby League. While playing for Brothers, Hoffman was selected to represent Queensland for three matches. In 1979, he played for the state against New South Wales and Great Britain, and in 1980 against New South Wales in one of the non-State of Origin matches.

In 1983 and 1985, Hoffman was awarded the Clubman of the Year at Canberra.

References

Sources
 
 

1958 births
Australian rugby league players
Canberra Raiders players
Living people
Rugby league hookers
Place of birth missing (living people)